Willie Els (born 23 June 1958) is a South African cricketer. He played in nine first-class matches in 1977/78 and 1978/79.

References

External links
 

1958 births
Living people
South African cricketers
Border cricketers
Eastern Province cricketers
Cricketers from East London, Eastern Cape